Rafi Razzak (born March 28, 1949) is founder and owner of Centerprise International (CI), a provider of managed IT and system integration services to corporate, government and education customers in the UK. CI claims to be the longest standing Ministry of Defence approved IT supplier in the UK, since 1992.

Career
Razzak is the son of Arif Abd ar-Razzaq, who was Prime Minister of Iraq in 1965. He studied electronics engineering at Imperial College London and started CI in 1983, after 9 years as an engineer at IBM and holding the position of vice president at PAC International. He won CBI Entrepreneur of the Year in 2000. Rafi is an investor of the UK marketplace "OnBuy", in partnership with entrepreneur and founder of OnBuy.com, Cas Paton.

He is also a former Chairman of Basingstoke Town Football Club., and won Basingstoke Businessman of the Year in 2009 and the Basingstoke Ambassador Award in 2012.

Philanthropic work
Razzak helped fundraise for a cancer treatment centre for Hampshire and West Berks  and has sponsored the Business and the Community Award at the Inspire 2012 Business Awards.

References 

Basingstoke Town F.C.
English football chairmen and investors
Iraqi emigrants to the United Kingdom
Alumni of Imperial College London
Living people
1949 births